The Southern League is a men's football competition featuring semi-professional clubs from East Anglia, the South and Midlands of England, and South Wales. Together with the Isthmian League and the Northern Premier League it forms levels seven and eight of the English football league system.

The structure of the Southern League has changed several times since its formation in 1894, and currently there are 84 clubs which are divided into four divisions. The Central and South Divisions are at step 3 of the National League System (NLS), and are feeder divisions, mainly to the National League South but also to the National League North. Feeding the Premier Divisions are two regional divisions, Division One Central and Division One South, which are at step 4 of the NLS. These divisions are in turn fed by various regional leagues.

The league has its administrative head office at Eastgate House in the City of Gloucester.

History

Football in the south of England
Professional football (and, indeed, professional sports in general) developed more slowly in Southern England than in Northern England. Professionalism was first sanctioned by The Football Association as early as 1885, but when The Football League was founded in 1888 its member clubs were based entirely in the North and Midlands, as the county football associations in the South were firmly opposed to professionalism.

Woolwich Arsenal (nowadays simply Arsenal) were the first club in London to turn professional in 1891 and were one of the prime motivators behind an attempt to set up a Southern League to mirror the existing Northern and Midlands based Football League. However, this venture failed in the face of  opposition from the London Football Association, and Woolwich Arsenal instead joined the Football League as its only representative south of Birmingham in 1893. Additionally, an amateur league, the Southern Alliance, was founded in 1892, with seven clubs from the region, but that folded after one incomplete season.

Formation of the Southern League
Nonetheless, another attempt was made to form the Southern League, and this time it was successful. A competition for both professional and amateur clubs was founded in 1894 under the initiative of Millwall Athletic (now simply Millwall). Initially only one division was envisaged, but such was the enthusiasm for the idea, that eventually two divisions were formed. The sixteen original founder members were:

2nd Scots Guards withdrew before the first season started and were replaced by Southampton St Mary's. Woolwich Arsenal attempted to add their reserve side to the second division but this application was refused due to the club's existing membership of The Football League.

Success of the Southern League
The Southern League soon became the dominant competition below The Football League in Southern and Central England, and by the turn of the century a few of the Southern League sides began to seriously rival the Football League in the FA Cup. A preview of the 1900–01 season in the Daily News described the league as "now, without a doubt, second only in importance and the strength of its clubs to the Football League itself. With the exception of Woolwich Arsenal, who prefer to remain members of the Second Division of the Football League, all the best professional teams in the South are now enrolled in the ranks of the Southern League".

Two Southern League clubs, Southampton (in 1900 and 1902) and Tottenham Hotspur (in 1901) reached the final of the FA Cup around the turn of the twentieth century. Tottenham Hotspur remain the only club from outside the Football League (and since its inception, also the Premier League) to have won the FA Cup.

Several of the best players in England moved from the Football League to the Southern League around this time, due to the restrictions on their freedom of movement and wages implemented by the Football League between 1893 and 1901, and the failed efforts of the Association Footballers' Union (the AFU) to relax the restrictions. This ended in 1910 when the League came to a reciprocal agreement with the Football League.

The champions of the two leagues during this period met in the annual Charity Shield. Out of the six meetings the respective league champions had in the Shield, however, only one was won by the Southern League champions – Brighton & Hove Albion, in 1910, and this remains their only top level national honour. Up until World War I, the league also organised several representative 'inter-league' matches, against the Football League XI and the Scottish Football League XI. They won the inaugural inter-league equivalent of the British Home Championship in 1910, defeating the Football League 3–2, Scottish League 1–0 and the Irish League 4–0.

In 1907, it accepted newly-converted-to-Association and future Football League club Bradford, a northern club, as a member, reflecting its senior position at the time. Stalybridge Celtic and Stoke also joined before the First World War.

In 1920, virtually the entire top division of the Southern League was absorbed by the Football League to become that league's new Third Division. A year later the Third Division was expanded and regionalised. The Third Division clubs from the previous season became the Third Division South, with the addition of the Third Division North.

Of the original founder members, six – Gillingham (formerly New Brompton), Luton Town, Millwall, Reading, Southampton and Swindon Town – went on to be Football League clubs.

A feeder league
For the next six decades, the Football League and Southern League would occasionally exchange a limited number of clubs as a result of the older league's re-election process. From 1920 onward, the Southern League's status as a semi-professional league was firmly established. In 1977, Wimbledon became the last Southern League club to successfully achieve election into the Football League.

With its clubs seeking a more regular means of advancing to the Football League, in 1979 the Southern League became a feeder to the new Alliance Premier League along with the Isthmian League and the Northern Premier League, and the top Southern clubs of the day joined the new league. In turn, the APL (renamed Football Conference in 1986 and National League in 2015) would eventually succeed in becoming a feeder to the Football League. The league lost more of its top clubs in 2004 when the Conference added two regional divisions below the existing National League, the Conference South and Conference North.

In May 2017, the FA chose the Southern League to add an additional division at step 3 as part of another restructuring in the NLS; the two Premier Divisions were set at 22 clubs each. The new Central Division started playing in the 2018–19 season.

Sponsorship
The first sponsor of the Southern League was Beazer Homes who sponsored the league from 1987 to 1996. The sponsors after Beazer Homes to the present day are: Dr Martens (1996–2004), British Gas (2006–2009), Zamaretto (2009–2011),  Evo-Stik (2011–2013), Calor Gas (2013–2014), Evo-Stik (2014–2019) and BetVictor (2019–2020). From the 2020–21 season the league has been sponsored by Pitching In, Entain's grassroots sports investment programme. At the time of announcement, Entain went by its former name GVC Holdings. Under this partnership, the Southern League is marketed as one of the three Trident Leagues, alongside its Isthmian and Northern Premier counterparts.

Current members

Premier Central

Premier South

Division One Central

Division One South

Champions
This section lists the past winners of the Southern League. Winners to 1993 source:

For the 1898–99 season, Division Two was divided into London and South-West sections, with a playoff contested between the winners of each section.

For the 1899–1900 season, the league reverted to the old format, after all the members of the South-West section resigned.

For the 1909–10 season, Division Two was split into an 'A' section and a 'B' section, with the winners of each section contesting a play-off for the Division Two championship.

For the 1910–11 season, the league again reverted to the previous format.

At the end of the 1919–20 season, the majority of the clubs in the First Division moved into the new Third Division of the Football League. The Southern League was therefore split into two sections for England and Wales, with the winners of each section contesting a playoff for the Southern League championship.

For the 1923–24 season, the league was split into two regional sections, with the winners of each section contesting a playoff for the Southern League championship.

For the 1933–34 season an extra section, the Central Section was introduced to provide additional fixtures. The Central included clubs from the other two sections and did not contribute to the overall championship.

For the 1936–37 season, the Eastern and Western sections were merged into a single division. Additional fixtures were obtained through the Midweek Section which did not contribute to the overall championship.

For the 1945–46 season, the Midweek Section was not played due to power restrictions after the Second World War.

For the 1958–59 season the Southern League was again divided into two sections: North-Western and South-Eastern. The winners of each section contested a playoff for the Southern League championship.

The following season saw the two sections merged to form a Premier Division, and a new Division One introduced.

For the 1971–72 season Division One was regionalised.

For the 1979–80 season, thirteen Premier Division clubs joined the newly formed Alliance Premier League. The Premier Division and Division One were subsequently merged, and two regional divisions formed.

For the 1982–83 season, the Premier Division was re-introduced, above the regional divisions.

For the 1999–2000 season, the regional divisions were renamed the Eastern and Western divisions.

For the 2006–07 season, the two regional divisions were renamed Division One Midlands and Division One South & West.

For the 2009–10 season, Division One Midlands was renamed Division One Central.

For the 2017–18 season, the Central and South & West divisions were renamed back into East and West respectively.

For the following season, the Premier Division was regionalised, becoming the South Division, and a Central Division was added. The East and West divisions were realigned into Central and South again.

Promoted
Since the league's formation in 1894, the following clubs have won promotion to higher levels of the English football league system -

Asterisk indicates club was promoted via play-offs

League Cup winners
Article: Southern Football League Cup

League structure
The league structure has changed several times over the years and currently consists of Central and South Divisions at step 3 of the National League System with Division One South and Division One Central at step 4.

Due in large part to the presence of the Isthmian League, the geographical footprint of the Southern League actually extends further north than the National League South.  Therefore, while the winners of the Central and South Divisions are promoted to the National League South, those clubs in the most northerly locales are promoted to the National League North. In the past, the majority of the winners of the former Premier Division, together with the winners of a playoff, were promoted to the higher league.

Clubs relegated from the Southern League can theoretically be placed in any of fourteen lower-level leagues, but in practice it is likely to be one of the following (based on geography):

Combined Counties League
Hellenic League
Midland Football League
Spartan South Midlands League
United Counties League
Wessex League
Western League

From time to time, clubs outside the promotion and relegation positions based at the geographical edges of the Southern League will be compelled to leave the League by the NLS Committee, should it be necessary for them to compete in the Northern Premier League or Isthmian League so as to correct any imbalances brought on by the geographical distribution of the clubs promoted and relegated to this level. Clubs in the Northern Premier League or Isthmian League have also been entered into the Southern League for the same reason. In general, there has been a drift southwards, with clubs in the Midlands moving into the Northern Premier League.

See also
Isthmian League
Northern Premier League

References

External links
Official website

 
7
Sports leagues established in 1894
1894 establishments in England
Southern England
Eng